Macoun is a village in the Canadian province of Saskatchewan within the Rural Municipality of Cymri No. 36 and Census Division No. 2. The village is located 28 km (17.2 miles) northwest of the City of Estevan on Highway 39.

History 
Macoun incorporated as a village on October 16, 1903. On April 20, 1914, an acetylene gas plant explosion in the cellar of the Macoun Hotel and the resulting fire caused 13 deaths. In the early 1900s acetylene was widely used for illumination.

Notable residents
Notable people from Macoun include:
Leonard Gustafson, Canadian senator
Kim Thorson, politician

Demographics 

See also 

 List of communities in Saskatchewan
 Villages of Saskatchewan

References

Villages in Saskatchewan
Cymri No. 36, Saskatchewan
Division No. 2, Saskatchewan